These are the results of the 2001 United Kingdom general election in Wales. The election was held on 7 June 2001 and all 40 seats in Wales were contested. The overall result remained exactly the same as in the previous election in 1997, with only two changes - Labour gained Ynys Môn from Plaid Cymru and Plaid gained Carmarthen East and Dinefwr from Labour. The Conservatives once again won no seats; this was only the second election since 1918 to leave them with no representation in Wales.

Results
Below is a table summarising the results of the 2001 general election in Wales.

Outcome and changes

A BBC report of the election in Wales stated that "Despite a night of high tension the political map in Wales virtually looks the same as before". The only seats to change hands were Carmarthen East and Dinefwr which Adam Price of Plaid Cymru gained from Labour and Ynys Môn which Labour gained from Plaid Cymru. Plaid failed to gain Rhondda which Chris Bryant held for Labour with a majority of over 16,000, a result the BBC said mean that Bryant had "confounded his critics". Bryant, a former curate who had once been a member of the Conservatives had been criticised as being an odd fit and "too exotic" for traditional Labour supporters in the consistency which he was contesting for the first time. This had led Plaid Cymru to feel they had a chance of a victory, a feet they had surprisingly achieved in the equivalent constituency at the 1999 National Assembly for Wales election. Plaid's candidate Leanne Wood had publicly claimed she would win 53% of the vote.

The Conservatives again failed to win any seat in Wales, with their best result being in Monmouth where they finished just 384 votes behind Labour. The Liberal Democrats failed to add to their two seats, with Jenny Willott reducing Labour's majority in Cardiff Central to just 659 votes.

References

Wales
2001 in Wales
2000s elections in Wales
2001